Thomas II (? – 15 November 669) was the Ecumenical Patriarch of Constantinople from 667 to 669. He had been ecumenically preceded by Patriarch Peter of Constantinople. During the troubled times of the Christological disputes, he was Orthodox in his faith and teaching. He is commemorated by the Church on November 16.  He was succeeded as ecumenical Patriarch by His All-Holiness John V of Constantinople.

Life
Little is known of his life. Thomas was in the service of the patriarchate in which he served as a scribe, a refendarius, a chancellor of the Patriarchate, and director of the Scala Gerokoeion and the Neapolis Ptochotropheion. Thomas was elected patriarch from the diaconate over six and a half months after the repose of his predecessor, Patriarch Peter. His consecration has been dated as on Holy Saturday in the year 665.

The length of his rule as patriarch is uncertain, as sources differ as to it length. The sources vary from two years and seven months according to Nicephoros, to three years by Theophanes, to four years and seven months on Leoglavious' list. Patriarch Thomas reposed in 669

References

Sources

7th-century patriarchs of Constantinople